Meff is a derogatory term used in north-west England, especially Liverpool, to describe a dirty, smelly individual or a person with disgusting habits. It is derived from the practice of hardened alcoholics drinking methylated spirits as they are untaxed and therefore cheaper.

The word came to national prominence in 2015, when it was used to describe then UK Independence Party deputy leader Paul Nuttall, as a "Bad Bootle Ukip meff" by the Liverpool Echo .

References

Pejorative terms for people